Puka Urqu (Quechua puka red, urqu mountain, "red mountain", also spelled Puca Orkho) is a mountain in the Bolivian Andes which reaches a height of approximately . It is located in the Potosí Department, Tomás Frías Province, Yocalla Municipality. Puka Urqu lies at the Ingenio Mayu north of Kunturiri.

References 

Mountains of Potosí Department